Latin Airplay is a chart published weekly by Billboard magazine in the United States. It was established on October 20, 2012.

This chart lists the 50 most-played songs on Spanish-language radio stations across the country as monitored by Nielsen Broadcast Data Systems (BDS) weighted to each station's Nielsen ratings. It is based on the Hot Latin Songs chart's former methodology prior to October 20, 2012 which was revamped afterwards to rank the best-performing Spanish-language songs based on streaming, digital downloads, and airplay from all radio stations in the US. Although the Latin Airplay was launched on October 20, 2012, it retroactively includes songs that ranked on the Hot Latin Songs since the issue dated November 12, 1994, which was when the Billboard began incorporating Nielsen BDS to the Hot Latin Songs chart methodology. Unlike the Hot Latin Songs chart, the Latin Airplay does not require a song to be predominately sung in Spanish, thus any song is eligible to rank on it.

The first number one song at the chart's launch was "Algo Me Gusta de Ti" by Wisin & Yandel featuring Chris Brown and T-Pain, while the online database lists "No Me Queda Más" by Selena as its first number one. The current number one song is Bzrp Music Sessions, Vol. 53" by Bizarrap and Shakira.

Component charts 
The Latin Airplay has four subcharts that not only contributes to the overall calculation of the chart, but reflects on the diverse Spanish-language music genres that are listened to by the Hispanic audience. They were previously subcharts of the Hot Latin Songs chart prior to Billboard changing its methodology in 2012. These are:
Latin Pop Airplay: Ranks the best-performing Spanish-language Latin pop songs, namely pop ballads and mid/up-tempo tracks, on Spanish-language radio stations. Prior to August 15, 2020, the chart listed the most-played songs on Latin pop radio stations.
Tropical Airplay: Ranks the best-performing Spanish-language tropical songs, specifically, musical styles originating from the Hispanophone Caribbean, on Spanish-language radio stations. Prior to January 21, 2017, the chart listed the most-played songs on tropical radio stations.
Regional Mexican Airplay: Ranks the most-played songs on Regional Mexican radio stations in the US. It is the only subchart of the Latin Airplay chart that continues to be spin-based, rather than audience impression from all Spanish-language radio stations like the other charts listed.
Latin Rhythm Airplay: Ranks the best-performing Spanish-language Latin rhythm songs such as reggaeton and Latin hip hop/Latin trap on Spanish-language radio stations. Prior to January 8, 2011, the chart listed the most-played songs on Latin rhythm radio stations.

Chart achievements

Artists with the most number-one hits

Artists with the most top-ten hits

Artists with the most entries

Songs with the most weeks at number one

References

External links
Billboard Latin Airplay chart – online version.

Billboard charts
Latin music